Iperf is a tool for network performance measurement and tuning. It is a cross-platform tool that can produce standardized performance measurements for any network. Iperf has client and server functionality, and can create data streams to measure the throughput between the two ends in one or both directions. Typical iperf output contains a time-stamped report of the amount of data transferred and the throughput measured.

The data streams can be either Transmission Control Protocol (TCP) or User Datagram Protocol (UDP):
 UDP: When used for testing UDP capacity, iperf allows the user to specify the datagram size and provides results for the datagram throughput and the packet loss.
 TCP: When used for testing TCP capacity, iperf measures the throughput of the payload. Iperf uses 1024 × 1024 for mebibytes and 1000 × 1000 for megabytes.
Iperf is open-source software written in C, and it runs on various platforms including Linux, Unix and Windows (either natively or inside Cygwin). The availability of the source code enables the user to scrutinize the measurement methodology.

Iperf is a compatible reimplementation of the ttcp program that was developed at the National Center for Supercomputing Applications at the University of Illinois by the Distributed Applications Support Team (DAST) of the National Laboratory for Applied Network Research (NLANR), which was shut down on December 31, 2006, on termination of funding by the United States National Science Foundation.

iperf3
Iperf3 is a rewrite of iperf from scratch to create a smaller, simpler code base. It also includes a library version which enables other programs to use the provided functionality.  Another change is that iperf3 is single threaded while iperf2 is multi-threaded. Iperf3 was started in 2009, with the first release in January 2014. Iperf3 is not backwards compatible with iperf2.

Iperf3 doesn't officially support Windows, only Linux. Vivien Guéant did compile it to Windows back in 2016 but hasn't been maintained since.

A user of Neowin, Budman has since been compiling the latest Windows versions of Iperf and maintains them on his server.

CurrentLinux versions information and builds are still actively developed.

Most Current Linux distributions have up-to-date versions of iperf3 in their native package repositories (as of 1. December 2021)

See also
 Netperf
 Nuttcp
 NetPIPE
 bwping
 Flowgrind
 Measuring network throughput
 Packet generation model

References

External links
 Iperf 2 & Iperf 3 Comparison Table
 

 

Network performance
Software using the BSD license
Free software programmed in C